Biosecurity Act 1993 is an Act of Parliament in New Zealand. The Act is a restatement and reform of the laws relating to pests and other unwanted organisms. It was a world first.

In the Act an "unwanted organism" is defined to be one that "is capable or potentially capable of causing unwanted harm to any natural and physical resources or human health" and a "restricted organism" means "any organism for which a containment approval has been granted in accordance with the Hazardous Substances and New Organisms Act 1996".

Part 5 of the Act provides for a National Pest Management Strategy and Regional Pest Management Strategy.

See also
Biosecurity in New Zealand
Biodiversity of New Zealand
Conservation in New Zealand
Environment Act 1986
Ministry for the Environment (New Zealand)
National Pest Plant Accord

References

External links
Biosecurity Act 1993 - text of the Act
Biosecurity New Zealand, part of Ministry for Primary Industries

Statutes of New Zealand
Nature conservation in New Zealand
1993 in New Zealand law
Biosecurity
Pest legislation